Baazaar is a 2018 Indian Hindi-language financial thriller drama film directed by Gauravv K. Chawla and written by   Parveez Sheikh and Aseem Arora. The film starring Saif Ali Khan, debutant Rohan Vinod Mehra, Radhika Apte and Chitrangada Singh in lead roles.

The film is set in the backdrop of money, power and business, largely based on the stock market. The film was released on 26 October 2018. The film received mixed reviews from critics upon releasing.

Plot
Small-time Allahabad-based stock trader Rizwan Ahmed (Rohan Mehra) arrives in Mumbai by flight. He is determined to work with his role model, wealthy and powerful Gujarati diamond merchant Shakun Kothari (Saif Ali Khan). Rizwan bluffs his way into the city's largest trading firm and manages to convince them to give him a job. He ropes in a high-profile client and with the help of his co-worker and girlfriend Priya Rai (Radhika Apte), he begins a successful career at the firm. When attending an event with Priya, he spots Shakun Kothari and gives stock advice that turns out to be correct. Kothari then hires him as his broker, warning that he may never lose any of his money. After his first trade with Kothari's funds ends badly, Rizwan is desperate not to lose Kothari's account and illegally uses insider information from Priya to recoup Kothari's losses..

Rizwan becomes close to Kothari and his wife Mandira Parekh (Chitrangda Singh), visiting Kothari's lavish home and relaxing on his yacht with Priya. Meanwhile, Kothari offers Rizwan a chance to make even more money when he learns that the government is going to begin accepting bids from telecommunications companies for a new project. Kothari informs Rizwan that he has bribed a government minister to select a company called Skycom and the two can make a killing on the deal. Kothari gives Rizwan the money to buy Skycom and Rizwan becomes the company's owner. Rizwan convinces his new brother-in-law Anwar to invest all of his savings to Skycom shares. However, Skycom's bid is rejected, and Rizwan is ruined when Kothari sells off all of his Skycom shares right before the announcement of the bid winner.

Rizwan discovers that Kothari deliberately set him up to take the fall for Skycom for Kothari's own personal monetary profit and that he arranged for Priya to influence him from the beginning. SEBI agents, led by Rana Dasgupta (Manish Choudhary), detain Rizwan for insider trading, though their real target is Kothari. Rizwan convinces them that Shakun has been using old school methods which will not leave any evidence or trail behind. Using information from Mandira, Rizwan is able to prove that Kothari has been bribing government ministers with diamonds that are smuggled via Surat-Mumbai Karnavati Express train. Shakun is arrested and his family leaves him. After the numerous court hearings, Shakun is summoned as Priya gives in as a witness to the bribes. Rizwan questions her as to why she surrendered herself since Rizwan did not reveal her name, but she leaves Rizwan, saying she deserves this. Shakun comes out on bail after a month and returns to his empty house, his wife and kids gone. He calls his secretary and tells him, that the market (Baazaar) is open, returning to his deeds.

Cast

Saif Ali Khan as Shakun Kothari, main protagonist
 Rohan Mehra as Rizwan Ahmed
Radhika Apte as Priya Rai
Chitrangada Singh as Mandira Kothari / Milloni Kapadia as Young Mandira Kothari
Raddheya Mahendru as Alisha Kothari
Anika Malhotra as Nayantara Kothari
Sonia Balani as Aamna Ahmed
Pawan Chopra as Zulfiqar Ahmed
Denzil Smith as Kishore Wadhwa
Karan Singh Chhabra as stock exchange reporter 
Manish Choudhary as Rana Dasgupta
Ravindra Singh Bakshi as Balwinder
Deepak Gheewala as Gaganbhai
Utkarsh Mazumdar as Chhedha
Abhishek Gupta as Anwar
Ajit Satbhai as Bipinbhai
Danish Husain as Dubey
Krunal Pandit as Mani Shankar
Vikram Kapadia as Sandeep Talwar
Vijay Tilani as Aashish
Sai Gundewar as Suhas Sharma
Yogesh Lakhani as Businessman
Gaurav Sharma as Sagar Malhotra
Sahil Sangha as Vineet Mehra
Elli Avram (special appearance in song "Billionaire")
Raamdeo Agrawal as himself

Soundtrack

The music of the film was composed by Tanishk Bagchi, Honey Singh, Kanika Kapoor, Sohail Sen and Bilal Saeed. The lyrics were penned by Shabbir Ahmed, Honey Singh, Ikka, Jamil Ahmed, Singhsta, Hommie Dilliwala, and Bilal Saeed.

Bilal Saeed recreated his own song La La La, which was originally sung by Arjun Kanungo.

Release
The first poster was released on 4 May 2017 depicting Khan in a suit. The poster read "Yaha paisa Bhagwaan nahi, par Bhagwaan se kam bhi nahi" (Here money is not God but also it is not less than God).

The official trailer for the film was released on 25 September 2018. The film itself was released on 26 October 2018.

Reception
The film received mostly mixed reviews from critics, who cited its similarity to Oliver Stone's Wall Street, but praised Saif Ali Khan for his performance. On the review aggregator site Rotten Tomatoes, 27% of 11 critics' reviews are positive, with an average rating of 4/10

References

External links
 
 

2018 films
2018 thriller drama films
2010s Hindi-language films
Indian thriller drama films
Films scored by Tanishk Bagchi
Films scored by Yo Yo Honey Singh
Films scored by Kanika Kapoor
Films scored by Sohail Sen
Films scored by Bilal Saeed
Viacom18 Studios films
2010s business films
Indian business films